Daryl Davis (born March 26, 1958) is an American R&B and blues musician and activist. His efforts to fight racism, in which, as an African American, he has engaged with members of the Ku Klux Klan (KKK), have convinced a number of Klansmen to leave and denounce the KKK. Known for his energetic style of boogie-woogie piano, Davis has played with such musicians as Chuck Berry, Jerry Lee Lewis, B. B. King, and Bruce Hornsby.

He is the subject of the 2016 documentary Accidental Courtesy: Daryl Davis, Race & America.

Early life
Born in Chicago, Illinois, Davis was the son of a Department of State Foreign Service officer and moved around the world with his parents during most of his early childhood. Living in various foreign countries, including African nations, Davis grew accustomed to the casually integrated schools of foreign diplomats, where children of many nations, races, and cultures were schooled together.  At the age of ten, he returned to the United States and joined an all-white Cub Scout pack in Belmont, Massachusetts. In one incident, he was carrying the flag and marching with his troop in a local parade, when he was struck with rocks and bottles thrown from the crowd, prompting the pack leaders to form a protective ring around him. Davis did not understand the incident until he discussed it with his father. The irrationality of the incident, in his mind, led to a curiosity about the origins and basis for such racist attitudes, which would later shape much of his future activity.

Davis is a Christian.

Music career
Davis absorbed the style of blues musicians from the Mississippi Delta who had migrated north. In 1980, he earned a bachelor of music degree from Howard University, where he was a member of the Howard University Choir and Jazz Vocal Ensemble. Davis "was mentored by legendary pianists Pinetop Perkins and Johnnie Johnson, who both claimed him as their godson and praised his ability to master a piano style that was popular long before he was born", according to his Kennedy Center profile.

Davis has frequently played backup for Chuck Berry and Jerry Lee Lewis. He was a friend of Muddy Waters and played piano in The Legendary Blues Band. Davis has also performed with blues icon B. B. King. He has played with artists such as Elvis Presley's Jordanaires, The Platters, The Drifters, The Coasters, Bo Diddley, Percy Sledge, and Sam Moore (of Sam & Dave).

He was awarded "Best Traditional Blues/R&B Instrumentalist" at the 2009 Washington Area Music Awards. For several years, Davis served as artistic director of the Centrum Acoustic Blues Festival.

"Davis' piano work impresses with his winning combination of technique and abandon, and his vocals are strong and assured", wrote a reviewer in Living Blues Magazine.

Discography
 American Roots (2000)
 Alternate Routes (2008)
 Greatest Hits (2011)

Activism

Davis has worked to improve race relations by seeking out, engaging in dialogue with, and befriending members of the Ku Klux Klan. In 1983, he was playing country western music in a "white" bar in Frederick, Maryland, when a patron came up to him and said it was the first time he had "heard a black man play as well as Jerry Lee Lewis". Davis explained to the man that "Jerry Lee learned to play from black blues and boogie-woogie piano players and he's a friend of mine". The white patron was skeptical and over a drink admitted he was a member of the KKK. The two became friends and eventually the man gave Davis contact information on KKK leaders.

A few years later, Davis decided that he wanted to interview Klan members and write a book on the subject, to answer a "question in my head from the age of 10: 'Why do you hate me when you know nothing about me?' That question had never been answered from my youth".

In meeting with the Imperial Wizard of the KKK in Maryland, Roger Kelly, Davis concealed his race before the interview.

The meeting was tense. Kelly arrived at the motel with a bodyguard armed with a gun. Davis eventually became friends with Kelly  and was later invited to be Kelly's daughter's godfather.  When Kelly left the Klan, he gave his robe to Davis.

Davis eventually went on to befriend over twenty members of the KKK, and claims to have been directly responsible for between forty and sixty, and indirectly over two hundred people leaving the Klan. Over the course of his activities, Davis found that Klansmen have many misconceptions about black people, stemming mostly from intense brainwashing in their youth. When they got to know him, Davis claims, it was more difficult to maintain their prejudices. The artist has recounted his experiences in his 1998 book, Klan-destine Relationships: A Black Man's Odyssey in the Ku Klux Klan.

One Klansman told Davis that "All black people have a gene in them that makes them violent", based on the scientific finding that a 2-repeat MAOA gene increases the likelihood of violent activity, which was found to be most prevalent in African Americans.

Klan members have often invited Davis to meetings, and they have given him their robes and hoods. In 2016, Davis estimated having collected 25 or 26 robes. Among the "Knights of the Ku Klux Klan" he interviewed were Grand Klaliff Chester Doles, Grand Giant Tony LaRicci, and Grand Giant Bob White, according to The Washington Post. One Klan member gave Davis a medallion stamped with the words "KKK—Member in good standing".

Davis claims to be responsible for helping to dismantle the KKK in Maryland because things "fell apart" after he began making inroads with its members there. However, since then, the KKK was rebuilt in Maryland  under Richard Preston, leader of the Confederate White Knights, who was arrested for firing his gun at counterprotesters at the 2017 Unite the Right rally. Davis offered to post Preston's bail. He later took Preston to the National Museum of African American History. Shortly thereafter, he was asked to give away the bride at Preston's wedding.

"The lesson learned is: ignorance breeds fear", says Davis. "If you don't keep that fear in check, that fear will breed hatred. If you don't keep hatred in check, it will breed destruction".

Chester Doles, a member of the Klan, was convinced that Davis was a spy for the Anti-Defamation League or some other Klan-buster, and some of Davis's friends have found his fascination with the Klan to be odd. "He's attracted to controversy", says Adolph Wright, an old friend and fellow musician who believes Davis is a bit eccentric. "When the crowd goes right, he goes left", Wright told the Post.

Davis's father, retired senior Foreign Service officer William B. Davis, believed that his son engaged with the Klan because he needed to make sense of their hatred, to seek common ground. He remarked to The Washington Post that his son "has done something that I don't know any other black American, or white American, has done".

Accidental Courtesy documentary
In the 2016 documentary film Accidental Courtesy: Daryl Davis, Race & America, Davis interacts with KKK members and white Aryans and provides contrasting views of his activities from members of the Southern Poverty Law Center and Black Lives Matter.

Minds social network
Daryl Davis is an official advisor to the decentralized social network Minds. He uses the platform to educate people on how to conduct civil discourse to find common ground and build tolerance.

In an interview with Forbes, Davis said "…here [at Minds] you have an open forum where people are welcomed to bring their diverse ideas, even their beliefs, which people may not find popular and have civil discourse…the art of conversing with one another has been lost… This forum will allow people to come on there and be able to be transparent, to have conversation unlike some of the other platforms on the internet".

Davis believes education is the best remedy for curing hate: "[If] you fix the ignorance, there's nothing to fear. If there's nothing to fear, there's nothing to hate. If there's nothing to hate, there's nothing or no one to destroy".

In November 2019, Minds and Davis launched the Deradicalization Initiative to combat online extremism. In addition to workshops, meetups, and other live events, the initiative offers educational resources and ideas for promoting tolerance.

Changing Minds podcast
As part of the Deradicalization Initiative, Davis runs a podcast called Changing Minds. The show covers a wide range of topics, including politics, music, and race. Guests are equally diverse and have included notable figures such as:
 Former Ku Klux Klan Imperial Wizard Scott Shepherd.
 Former Al-Qaeda recruiter Jesse Morton.
 David Kaczynski, brother of "Unabomber" Ted Kaczynski
 Charles Berry Jr., Chuck Berry's son.
 Blues guitarist Bob Margolin
 Documentary film director and human rights activist Deeyah Khan
 Journalist and author Brian Karem

Acting
Davis has acted on stage, film, and television. He played a minor character in HBO's television series The Wire. He appeared on stage in William Saroyan's The Time of Your Life with Marcia Gay Harden, Brigid Cleary, and Richard Bauer, and in Elvis Mania at an off-Broadway theater in New York City. He received positive reviews for his role in Zora Neal Hurston's Polk County.

References

External links

 
 Changing Minds podcast
 
 Profile of Daryl Davis Band, Kennedy Center website
 "Daryl Davis - Reaching out to the KKK", in-depth interview/debate on BBC's HARDtalk, August 11, 2021.

1958 births
Living people
20th-century African-American musicians
20th-century American male musicians
20th-century American pianists
21st-century African-American musicians
21st-century American male musicians
21st-century American pianists
21st-century Christians
African-American Christians
African-American pianists
American blues pianists
American male pianists
American anti-racism activists
Boogie-woogie pianists
Chicago blues musicians
Howard University alumni
The Legendary Blues Band members